Euphaedra erici is a butterfly in the family Nymphalidae. It is found in the Democratic Republic of the Congo.

Similar species
Other members of the Euphaedra zaddachii species group q.v.

References

Butterflies described in 1987
erici
Endemic fauna of the Democratic Republic of the Congo
Butterflies of Africa